Květov is a municipality and village in Písek District in the South Bohemian Region of the Czech Republic. It has about 100 inhabitants.

Administrative parts
The village of Vůsí is an administrative part of Květov.

References

Villages in Písek District